Feltonville School No. 2, also known as the Feltonville School, is a historic school building located in the Feltonville neighborhood of Philadelphia, Pennsylvania.  It was designed by architect Henry deCourcy Richards and built in 1908. It is a two-story, brick building, four bays wide with a brick parapet.  It is in the Late Gothic Revival-style.

It was added to the National Register of Historic Places in 1988. The building is currently used as a Head Start.

References

School buildings on the National Register of Historic Places in Philadelphia
Gothic Revival architecture in Pennsylvania
School buildings completed in 1908
Olney-Oak Lane, Philadelphia
1908 establishments in Pennsylvania